Clean Oceans International, originally The Clean Oceans Project, is an ocean-oriented environmental organization founded in 2009 as an IRS 501c3 public benefit corporation. Clean Oceans International seeks to reduce plastic pollution in the oceans through a comprehensive global approach that includes research, technical innovation, public awareness, and efficient plastic waste management.

COI is based in Santa Cruz, California on the Santa Cruz Harbor, gateway to the Monterey Bay National Marine Sanctuary.

Plastic-to-fuel conversion strategy 
Approximately 80 percent of marine plastic pollution is generated from single-use polymer products that originate from land-based sources. Clean Oceans International (COI) promotes conversion of the plastic waste into valuable liquid fuels, including gasoline, diesel, and kerosene, using plastic-to-fuel conversion technology.  environmental engineering company.

COI plans to educate local communities and create a financial incentive for them to recycle plastic, keep their shorelines clean, and minimize plastic waste.

Research efforts 
COI is conducting research with nonprofit, academic, and government organizations including the National Oceanic and Atmospheric Administration and the Turtle Island Restoration Network.

Education 
COI is also working in collaboration with the Cabrillo Community College science department on an ocean debris survey pilot program.

External links

References

501(c)(3) organizations
Environmental organizations based in California
Environmental organizations established in 2009
Non-profit organizations based in California